Kushk-e Sofla and Kooshk Sofla may refer to:
 Kushk-e Sofla, Fars
 Kushk-e Sofla, Kerman
 Kushk-e Sofla, Lorestan